The Sindhudesh Liberation Army (also known as Sindh Liberation Army or SLA) is a Sindhi Militant organization based in the Sindh province of Pakistan. It became publicly known in 2010 after it claimed responsibility for a targeted bomb blast on railway tracks near Hyderabad, Pakistan. The group is currently active.

Darya Khan is the leader of the group. Pakistan's media also stated that Jeay Sindh Muttahida Mahaz's Chairman Mr. Shafi Muhammad Burfat is operating Sindhudesh Liberation Army from Kabul, however the claim doesn't have evidence.

Declaration as a terrorist organisation
Sindhudesh Liberation Army is designated as terrorist organisation by the government of Pakistan. Pakistan has repeatedly accused India of supporting Sindhudesh Liberation Army.

Attacks

The group is responsible for low-intensity bomb explosions in parts of  Sindh. In May 2012, the group claimed responsibility for low-intensity bomb explosions outside the bank branches and Automated Teller Machines (ATM) of the National Bank of Pakistan (NBP) in different districts of Sindh. Four people were injured in the attacks. In 2016, a vehicle of Chinese engineer was targeted with remote control bomb at Gulshan-e-Hadeed Karachi. Chinese national and his driver were injured in the explosion. Sindhudesh Liberation Army (SLA) claimed responsibility for the attack.

On August 5, 2020, the Sindhudesh Revolutionary Army (SRA), a Group Allied with SLA, claimed responsibility for a grenade attack on a rally organized by the Jamaat-i-Islami in Karachi that injured about 40 people. The rally was taken out on the first anniversary of  India government’s decision to revoke the special status of Jammu and Kashmir.

See also
 Balochistan Liberation Army
 Sindhudesh
 Sindhi Nationalism
 List of Sindhudesh Liberation Army attacks on Pakistan infrastructure in Sindh
 Insurgency in Sindh

References

Organisations designated as terrorist by Pakistan
National liberation movements
Separatism in Pakistan
Rebel groups in Pakistan
Sindhi nationalism
Research and Analysis Wing activities in Pakistan